This article shows the rosters of all participating teams at the women's basketball tournament at the 2016 Summer Olympics in Rio de Janeiro.

Group A

The following is the Australia roster in the women's basketball tournament of the 2016 Summer Olympics.

The following is the Belarus roster for the women's basketball tournament of the 2016 Summer Olympics.

The following is the Brazil roster for the women's basketball tournament of the 2016 Summer Olympics.

The following is the France roster for the women's basketball tournament of the 2016 Summer Olympics

The following is Japan's roster for the women's basketball tournament of the 2016 Summer Olympics.

The following is the Turkey roster in the women's basketball tournament of the 2016 Summer Olympics.

Group B

The following was the Canada roster in the women's basketball tournament of the 2016 Summer Olympics.

The following is the China roster for the women's basketball tournament of the 2016 Summer Olympics.

The following is the Senegal roster for the women's basketball tournament of the 2016 Summer Olympics.

The following is the Serbia roster in the women's basketball tournament of the 2016 Summer Olympics.

}

The following is the Spain roster in the women's basketball tournament of the 2016 Summer Olympics.

 | month = 5 | date = 28 | clublink = Florida State Seminoles | nat = USA | compyear = 2016 | compmonth = 8 | compdate = 6}}

|}
| style="vertical-align:top;" |
 Head coach

 Assistant coach(es)

Legend
Club – describes lastclub before the tournament
Age – describes ageon 6 August 2016
|}

The following was the United States roster for the women's basketball tournament of the 2016 Summer Olympics.

|}
| style="vertical-align:top;" |
 Head coach
Geno Auriemma
 Assistant coach(es)
Doug Bruno
Cheryl Reeve
Dawn Staley
Jerry Colangelo (executive director)

Legend
Club – describes lastclub before the tournament
Age – describes ageon August 6, 2016
|}

Statistics

Head Coaches representation by country
Head Coaches in bold represent their own country.

See also
Basketball at the 2016 Summer Olympics – Men's team rosters

References

External links
 – Rio 2016 Olympic Coverage

squads
2016